The Public Accounts Committee (PAC) (formally the Committee of Public Accounts) is a standing committee of Dáil Éireann, the lower house of the Irish Parliament. It oversees government expenditures to ensure they are effective and honest. It is responsible for examining reports of Comptroller and Auditor General on Departmental expenditure and certain other accounts. It also considers the Comptroller and Auditor General's reports of economy, efficiency, effectiveness evaluation systems, procedures and practices. The PAC has a key role to play in ensuring accountability and transparency in the way Government agencies allocate, spend and manage their finances and in guaranteeing that the taxpayer receives value for money for every euro spent. By the nature of its role as the public spending watchdog, the Committee of Public Accounts is one of the most powerful Oireachtas Committees.

Overview
It is established under Standing Order 163 of Dáil Éireann which requires it to be set up as a standing committee after each general election. The committee is constituted so as to be impartially representative of the Dáil and consists of thirteen members. A member of the Government or a Minister of State can not be a member of the PAC. It is normally chaired by a member of the opposition.

Membership
As of December 2022, the members of the committee are as follows:

Chairmen of the Public Accounts Committee 
It is customary for a member of the largest opposition party to chair the committee.

See also
 Public Accounts Committee

References

Oireachtas
Dáil Éireann
Irish budgets
Irel